Alice Tawhai is the pen name of a New Zealand fiction writer. She is of Tainui and Ngāpuhi tribes.

Tawhai's writing focuses on the experiences of ethnic minorities in New Zealand. She also highlights the voice of contemporary Māori culture. Her publication Festival of Miracles was shortlisted for the Montana Book Award for Best First Book and her collection of short stories, Luminous, was shortlisted for the Montana Book Award for Fiction in 2008.

In 2021, she released her debut novel Aljce in Therapy Land.

Publications 

 Festival of Miracles (2005, Huia Publications)
 Luminous (2007, Huia Publications)
 Dark Jelly (2011, Huia Publications)
Aljce in Therapy Land (2021, Lawrence and Gibson)

References

Living people
Year of birth missing (living people)
Tainui people
Ngāpuhi people
New Zealand fiction writers
New Zealand women short story writers
New Zealand Māori women
New Zealand Māori writers